"Blue Moon with Heartache" is a song written and recorded by American country music artist Rosanne Cash.  It was released in December 1981 as the third single from the album Seven Year Ache.  The song was Cash's third number one country hit.  The single stayed at number one for a single week and spent a total of 11 weeks on the chart.

Charts

Weekly charts

Year-end charts

References

1982 singles
1981 songs
Rosanne Cash songs
Songs written by Rosanne Cash
Columbia Records singles
Song recordings produced by Rodney Crowell